Shargeh is a village in Shuy Rural District, in the Central District of Baneh County, Kurdistan Province, Iran. According to the 2006 census its population was 77, from 14 families. The village is populated by Kurds.

References 

Towns and villages in Baneh County
Kurdish settlements in Kurdistan Province